The Western Railway of Alabama (WRA) also seen as "WofA" was created as the Western Railroad of Alabama by the owners of the Montgomery & West Point Railroad (M&WP) in 1860. It was built to further the M&WP's development West from Montgomery, Alabama to Selma, Alabama. When the line was constructed in 1870, the M&WP was merged into the WRA, creating a line from Selma to West Point, Georgia. It served Auburn, Alabama and connected in Opelika, Alabama to the Central of Georgia line from Columbus, Georgia to Birmingham, Alabama. Although it was partially owned by the Central of Georgia around the turn from the nineteenth to the twentieth century, it did not end up being owned by Norfolk Southern when that company came into existence due to the merger of the CofG's parent, the Southern Railway, and the Norfolk & Western Railway.

In the 1980s, the line and its sister railroads, the Atlanta & West Point Railroad and the Georgia Railroad, became part of the Family Lines System, along with the Seaboard Coast Line Railroad, the Louisville & Nashville Railroad and the Clinchfield Railroad. The lines were all later renamed Seaboard System Railroad, which in 1986 merged with the Chessie System to become CSX Transportation.

The WRA still sees regular freight service. Passenger service ceased January 7, 1970.

References

External links
Georgia Railroad History Pages

Defunct Alabama railroads
Defunct Georgia (U.S. state) railroads
Former Class I railroads in the United States
Historic American Engineering Record in Alabama
Predecessors of CSX Transportation
Railway companies established in 1883
Railway companies disestablished in 2002
Seaboard System Railroad